The Art of War: World War III is the ninth studio album by hip hop group Bone Thugs-N-Harmony. It was released on December 10, 2013, on Seven Arts Music and BTNH Worldwide. The album serves as the sequel to their quadruple platinum double album, The Art of War.

Like previous Bone offerings Thug Stories and Strength & Loyalty, this album features a trio lineup, with two of the five members generally absent from the group at the time of the album's recording. However, this trio consists of Bizzy, Layzie and Flesh, as Krayzie and Wish had temporary left the group while in a state of conflict. Nevertheless, Krayzie and Wish appear on the album due to usage of unreleased tracks previously recorded for Uni-5: The World's Enemy.

Track listing

Charts

References

Bone Thugs-n-Harmony albums
2013 albums
Sequel albums